WHLA may refer to:

 WHLA (FM), a radio station (90.3 FM) licensed to serve La Crosse, Wisconsin, United States
 WHLA-TV, a television station (channel 15, virtual 31) licensed to serve La Crosse, Wisconsin